Bratton Township may refer to the following townships in the United States:

 Bratton Township, Adams County, Ohio
 Bratton Township, Mifflin County, Pennsylvania